Stasha Palos (born 1972) is a British artist and author.

Early life and education
Palos was born in Johannesburg in 1977 but moved to London with her family when she was seven. Her parents are divorced. Her father was Greek-South African jazz drummer turned retailer Robert Palos. Her mother is Tina Green, the wife of British clothing magnate Sir Philip Green.

References

1972 births
English writers
Living people
Women cookbook writers
People from Johannesburg
Writers from London
South African people of Greek descent
South African emigrants to the United Kingdom